James Reynolds House is a historic home located at Cape Girardeau, Missouri.  It was built in 1857, and is a -story, painted brick dwelling with a one-story rear kitchen wing.  Its design was influenced by French Colonial architecture. It sits on a coursed rubble sandstone foundation and features a full-width front porch.

It was listed on the National Register of Historic Places in 1983.

References

Houses on the National Register of Historic Places in Missouri
Houses completed in 1857
Houses in Cape Girardeau County, Missouri
National Register of Historic Places in Cape Girardeau County, Missouri
1857 establishments in Missouri